Tim Gruijters (born 28 August 1991) is a Dutch cricketer. He is a right-handed batsman and right-arm spin bowler.

Gruijters made his One Day International debut for the Dutch national team against Kenya on 16 February 2010. He made his Twenty20 International debut against Scotland on 22 March 2012, scoring 11 runs from six balls.

References

External links

1983 births
Living people
Dutch cricketers
Netherlands One Day International cricketers
Netherlands Twenty20 International cricketers
Cricketers at the 2007 Cricket World Cup
Cricketers at the 2011 Cricket World Cup
Sportspeople from The Hague